Mikhail Ryzhov is the name of:

 Mikhail Ryzhov (footballer) (born 1981), Russian football player
 Mikhail Ryzhov (racewalker) (born 1991), Russian racewalker